Evelyn Venable (October 18, 1913 – November 15, 1993) was an American actress perhaps best known for her role as Grazia in the 1934 film Death Takes a Holiday. In addition to acting in around two dozen films during the 1930s and 1940s, she was also the voice and model for the Blue Fairy in Walt Disney's Pinocchio (1940). She is one of a number of women who have been suggested to have served as the model for the personification of Columbia in the Columbia Pictures logo that was used from 1936 to 1976.

For her work in films, Venable has a star on the Hollywood Walk of Fame at 1500 Vine Street.

Life and career
Evelyn Venable was born on October 18, 1913 in Cincinnati, Ohio, the only child of Emerson and Dolores Venable. She graduated from Walnut Hills High School (class of 1930), where her father and grandfather William Henry Venable taught English. She performed in several plays at Walnut Hills, such as Juliet in Romeo and Juliet, the Dream Child in Dear Brutus and Rosalind in As You Like It. She attended Vassar College for a short time, then returned to the University of Cincinnati. She performed in Walter Hampden's touring productions, including Roxane in Cyrano de Bergerac and Ophelia in Hamlet.

During a performance in Los Angeles, she was recognized and offered several film contracts. After initially turning down the offers, she signed a contract with Paramount in 1932. Her contract was unique in that she would not have to cut her hair, pose for leg art, or perform in bit parts. A long-believed apocryphal story sprang up that she was forbidden by her father to engage in any kissing scenes in her films, and although this eventually proved to be false, she does not have any kissing scenes in her more memorable films. She played the lead or second lead in a series of films in the 1930s and claimed to be the original model for the Columbia Pictures logo, but the studio has never confirmed it.

She met cinematographer Hal Mohr on the set of the Will Rogers film David Harum (1934). They argued over her make-up the first day on set, apologized to each other the next, and Mohr proposed by the end of the week. Venable insisted they wait a year to marry because she feared a Hollywood divorce. They married on December 7, 1934, and had two daughters, Dolores and Rosalia. They were vegetarians.

Venable provided the voice of The Blue Fairy for the 1940 Walt Disney film Pinocchio.

In 1943, Venable retired from acting, resumed her studies at UCLA, and became a faculty member there, teaching ancient Greek and Latin and organizing the production of Greek plays within the Classics department.

Her husband Hal Mohr died in 1974. She died of cancer in Coeur d'Alene, Idaho on November 15, 1993 at age 80.

Partial filmography

Cradle Song (1933) as Teresa
David Harum (1934) as Ann Madison
Death Takes a Holiday (1934) as Grazia
Double Door (1934) as Anne Darrow
Mrs. Wiggs of the Cabbage Patch (1934) as Lucy Olcott
The County Chairman (1935) as Lucy Rigby
The Little Colonel (1935) as Elizabeth
Vagabond Lady (1935) as Miss Josephine 'Jo' Spiggins
Alice Adams (1935) as Mildred Palmer
Harmony Lane (1935) as Susan Pentland
Streamline Express (1935) as Patricia Wallace
Star for a Night (1936) as Anna Lind
North of Nome (1936) as Camilla Bridle
Happy Go Lucky (1936) as Mary Gorham
Racketeers in Exile (1937) as Myrtle Thornton
My Old Kentucky Home (1938) as Lisbeth Calvert
Hollywood Stadium Mystery (1938) as Pauline Ward
Female Fugitive (1938) as Peggy Mallory, aka Ann Williams
 The Headleys at Home (1938) as Pamela Headley
The Frontiersmen (1938) as June Lake
Heritage of the Desert (1939) as Miriam Naab
Pinocchio (1940) as The Blue Fairy (voice, uncredited)
Lucky Cisco Kid (1940) as Emily Lawrence
He Hired the Boss (1943) as Emily Conway
Get It (1943)
Uncivil War Birds (1946) as Beverly (uncredited)
Fright Night (1947) as Julia Seds (uncredited)

References

External links

 

American film actresses
American stage actresses
Actresses from Cincinnati
People from Greater Los Angeles
University of California, Los Angeles faculty
Deaths from cancer in Idaho
1913 births
1993 deaths
University of California, Los Angeles alumni
American voice actresses
20th-century American actresses